The Greatest Hits is a greatest hits album of recordings by Boney M. released by BMG in the United Kingdom in late 2001.

While the Netherlands, Belgium and Denmark celebrated Boney M's 25 year anniversary with comprehensive double albums, BMG UK opted for a one disc release, The Greatest Hits. The album included a new remix of 1976 break-through single "Daddy Cool", which was released as a single and reached the top 50 in the UK. While most of the tracks of this hits package are the original album versions it contains some overdubbed or remixed versions dating from Gold – 20 Super Hits.

In 2002 the compilation was issued in the United States by RCA, now a sub-label of Sony BMG, and in Australia it was released under the name Australia's Greatest Hits.

Track listing 
"Daddy Cool" (Frank Farian, George Reyam) – 3:30
"Rivers of Babylon" (album version) (Farian, Reyam) – 4:22
"Brown Girl in the Ring" (Farian) – 4:03
"Ma Baker" (Farian, Fred Jay, Reyam) – 4:36
"Rasputin" (album version, early fade) (Farian, Jay, Reyam) – 4:30
"Sunny" (Bobby Hebb) – 4:02
"Belfast" (Jimmy Bilsbury, Drafi Deutscher, Joe Menke) – 3:31
"Hooray! Hooray! It's a Holi-Holiday" (Farian, Jay) – 3:58
"Painter Man" (Eddie Phillips, Kenny Pickett) – 3:12
"Gotta Go Home" (Farian, Jay, Heinz Huth, Jürgen Huth) – 3:47
"Mary's Boy Child – Oh My Lord" (Jester Hairston, Farian, Jay, Hela Lorin) – 5:09
"No Woman, No Cry" (Bob Marley) – 4:19
"El Lute" (Farian, Jay, Hans Blum) – 4:00
"Night Flight to Venus" (Farian, Jay, Dietmar Kawohl) – 3:51
"I'm Born Again" (album version) (Jay, Helmut Rulofs) – 4:10
"My Friend Jack" (The Smoke) – 4:30
"Daddy Cool" (Remix 2001 - Jewels & Stone Club Mix) (Farian, Reyam) – 5:19
"Mega Mix" (1992) (Farian, Reyam, Hebb, Jay) – 3:51

The "Mega Mix" comprises "Rivers of Babylon", "Sunny", "Daddy Cool" and "Rasputin"

Personnel
 Liz Mitchell – lead vocals, backing vocals
 Marcia Barrett – lead vocals, backing vocals
 Frank Farian – lead vocals, backing vocals

Production
 Frank Farian – producer, remixer
 Jewels & Stone – remixers (track 17)

Charts

Certifications

Release history
 2001 UK: BMG 74321 896142
 2001 Australia: Australia's Greatest Hits, BMG International 89614
 2002 US: RCA 65108

References

Albums produced by Frank Farian
2001 greatest hits albums
Boney M. compilation albums